Odontomyia tigrina,  also called the black colonel, is a European species of soldier fly.

References

Stratiomyidae
Diptera of Europe
Insects described in 1775
Taxa named by Johan Christian Fabricius